Robert Henry Prouting (born 2 October 1938) is a New Zealand former cricketer. He played three first-class matches for Otago in 1969/70. He was born at Christchurch.

References

External links
 

1938 births
Living people
New Zealand cricketers
Otago cricketers
Cricketers from Christchurch